Santa Rosa Department may refer to:

Santa Rosa Department, Catamarca, Argentina
Santa Rosa Department, Mendoza, Argentina
Santa Rosa Department, Guatemala, Guatemala

Department name disambiguation pages